Mark Sanger (born 13 January 1974) is a British film editor.

Honours
In 2014 he was elected as a member of the Academy of Motion Picture Arts and Sciences and also as a member of the American Cinema Editors.

In July 2018 he was awarded an Honorary Doctor of Arts degree from Solent University.
In 2021 he became a member of the British Film Editors (BFE).

Filmography

Awards and nominations

2014
 Academy Award for Best Film Editing – Gravity (won)
 American Cinema Editors Award for Best Edited Feature Film – Dramatic – Gravity (nominated)
 BAFTA Award for Best Editing – Gravity (nominated)
 Saturn Award for Best Editing – Gravity (won)

2013
 Alliance of Women Film Journalists for Best Editing – Gravity (won)
 Chicago Film Critics Association Award for Best Editing – Gravity (won)
 Critics' Choice Movie Award for Best Editing – Gravity (won)
 Las Vegas Film Critics Society for Best Editing – Gravity (won)
 Los Angeles Film Critics Association for Best Editing – Gravity (won)
 Online Film Critics Society Award for Best Editing – Gravity (won)
 Phoenix Film Critics Society for Best Editing – Gravity (won)
 San Diego Film Critics Society for Best Editing – Gravity (nominated)
 San Francisco Film Critics Circle for Best Editing – Gravity (won)
 Satellite Award for Best Editing – Gravity (nominated)
 Washington D.C. Area Film Critics Association for Best Editing – Gravity (won)

References

External links
 
  Interview with Kevin Pollak, 2014, Kevin Pollak's Chat Show.
  Interview at Solent University, 2018, after receiving an Honorary Doctorate.
  Interview with Steve Hullfish, 2019 for 'Art of the Cut'.

1974 births
British film editors
Living people
Best Film Editing Academy Award winners
Film people from London
American Cinema Editors